Forzani is a surname. Notable people with the surname include:

Joe Forzani (born 1945), Canadian football player
John Forzani (1947–2014), Canadian businessman and football player
Forzani Group, sporting goods company founded by John Forzani
Johnny Forzani (born 1988), Canadian football player
Tom Forzani (born 1951), Canadian football player